The Idolmaster KR (stylized The IDOLM@STER.KR) is a South Korean television drama based on Bandai Namco Entertainment's The Idolmaster video game series. It premiered on Amazon Prime Video on April 28, 2017 as an Amazon original series. It ran for 24 episodes.

The series was later picked up by the SBS-owned pay TV channels SBS Plus, SBS funE, and SBS MTV. It premiered on these channels on April 28, 2017.

Cast   
Real Girls Project
Lee Su-ji (이수지) as Suji/Suah
Heo Youngjoo (허영주) as Youngjoo
Sori (김소리) as Sori
Yukika Teramoto (寺本來可 / 테라모토유키카) as Yukika
Kwon Ha-seo (권하서) as Haseo
Lee Jee-won (이지원) as Jeewon
Jung Tae-ri (정태리) as Taeri
Mint (민트) as Mint
Lee Ye-eun (이예은) as Yeeun
Cha Ji-seul (차지슬)  as Jiseul
Chun Jane (천재인) as Jane

Red Queen
Jo So-jin as Hyeju
Kim Sun-young as Mina
Han Hye-ri as Yeri
Lee Ka-eun as Chae Na-kyung

825 Entertainment
Sung Hoon as Kang Shin-hyuk, the former Producer of Red Queen.
Park Chul-min as Shim Min-chul, CEO of 825 Entertainment.
Kang Ye-seul as Yeseul, the girls' manager at 825 Entertainment.

Other characters
Heo Joungjoo as Joungjoo, Youngjoo's younger sister who is a singer-songwriter.
Lee Coco as Coco, an internet broadcast MC.
Jin Nayoung as Nayoung, Sori's friend.
Bae Seul-ki as Kim Dan-oh, a composer and vocal trainer.

Cameo
Kim Jung-ah as vocal training judge
Jung Tae-woo
Euna Kim as a rapper
Gowoon (Berry Good) as Bom-yi
Jung Hee-chul (ZE:A) as Haseo's brother
 Lee Moo-saeng as Chief Yang

Production
On October 13, 2016, The Idolmaster KR official website posted a notice of a member replacement; an original member of Real Girl Project, Hanabyul, had been replaced by sub-member Jiseul for the series, as Hanabyul was noted to have suffered from a leg injury. One month later, it was revealed that After School's Lee Ka-eun, Nine Muses' Sojin, Tahiti's Ari and I.B.I's Han Hye-ri would be joining the cast as members of 'Red Queen', a popular girl group at the time of Real Girl Project's debut, in the live-action series.

Soundtrack

Korean releases

OST Part 1

OST Part 2

OST Part 3

OST Part 4

Japanese releases

Episode 1

Episode 2

Episode 3

Episode 4

Episode 5

Discography

Singles

Notes

References

External links 

The Idolmaster KR at SBS.co.kr
The Idolmaster KR at Amazon Prime Video

Seoul Broadcasting System television dramas
KR
Works based on Bandai Namco video games
2017 South Korean television series debuts
Amazon Prime Video original programming
2017 South Korean television series endings
South Korean musical television series
Live action television shows based on video games